Khalkhal Mahalleh-ye Jadid (also Romanized as Khalkhāl Maḩalleh-ye Jadīd; also known as Khalkhālī Maḩalleh and Khalkhāl Maḩalleh) is a village in Goli Jan Rural District, in the Central District of Tonekabon County, Mazandaran Province, Iran. At the 2006 census, its population was 324, in 97 families.

References 

Populated places in Tonekabon County